Tim Martin may refer to:

People
 Tim Martin (American football) (born 1976), American football player
 Tim Martin (businessman) (born 1955), founder of British pub chain Wetherspoons
 Tim Martin (soccer) (born 1967), American soccer player who played for the San Jose Clash
 Tim Martin (human rights), director of Act Now, an NGO focussing on the human rights of Tamils in Sri Lanka

Fictional characters
 Timmy Martin, fictional character in Lassie